Barbara Kathleen Vera Woodhouse (née Blackburn; 9 May 1910 Rathfarnham, Ireland – 9 July 1988, Buckinghamshire, England) was an Irish-born British dog trainer, author, horse trainer and television personality. Her 1980 television series Training Dogs the Woodhouse Way made her a household name. Among her catch phrases were "walkies" and "sit!" She was also known for her "no bad dogs" philosophy.

Life
Barbara Blackburn was born on 9 May 1910 at St Columba's College in Rathfarnham, County Dublin, Ireland, to an Irish family. She grew up there until her father, the warden (headmaster) of the school, died suddenly in 1919. As described in her autobiography, the family moved to Brighton, England, a few weeks later, and afterwards to Headington in Oxford, where Woodhouse attended Headington School. She later became the only female student at the Harper Adams Agricultural College in Shropshire.

After returning to Oxford to start Headington Riding School and Boarding Kennels, she married her first husband, Allan George Mill, in August 1934 and moved with him to spend more than three years in Argentina training horses. The marriage ended in divorce and she returned to Headington.

In the 1930s, Barbara became a dog breeder and ran kennels until about 1960. Meanwhile she married a second husband, Michael Woodhouse, in 1940 and moved to Wiltshire and had three children, Pamela, Patrick and Judith. She first appeared on television as a contestant on What's My Line, where panellists failed to guess her occupation. She also appeared on CBS 60 Minutes. Her 1980 BBC series made her a television personality at the age of 70. She continued to appear on television regularly until she died on 9 July 1988 at the age of 78.

Woodhouse's autobiographical books include Talking to Animals and No Bad Dogs. She firmly believed there were "no bad dogs", just bad owners and defined it to mean dogs without genetic problems:

Woodhouse died in July 1988 after suffering from a stroke.

Television series
Training Dogs the Woodhouse Way
Barbara Woodhouse's World of Horses and Ponies
Barbara's Problem Dogs

Publications
Almost Human (1976) 
Barbara's World of Horses and Ponies: Their Care and Training the Woodhouse Way (1984) 
Barbara Woodhouse on How to Train Your Puppy 
Barbara Woodhouse on How Your Dog Thinks 
Barbara Woodhouse on Training Your Dog 
Book of Ponies (1981) 
Difficult Dogs (1957)
Dog Training My Way (1954) 
Encyclopedia of Dogs and Puppies (1978) 
Just Barbara: My Story (1986) 
No Bad Dogs: The Woodhouse Way (1982) 
No bad dogs and know your dog (1978) 
Talking to Animals (autobiography, 1954) 
The A-To-Z of Dogs and Puppies (1972) 
Walkies: Dog Training and Care the Woodhouse Way (1983) 
The Complete Woodhouse Guide to Dog Training (1990)

References

External links
Woodhouse and Headington

1910 births
1988 deaths
People educated at Headington School
People from Rathfarnham
British television presenters
Dog trainers
British horse trainers
Alumni of Harper Adams University
20th-century British zoologists